Brew Masters is a television series that was run weekly on Discovery Channel starting on Sunday, November 21, 2010.  The show focused on Sam Calagione, the founder and head of Dogfish Head Brewery in Milton, Delaware, and his staff as they searched the world for new, ancient, and imaginative inspirations for beers.

History
The show originated with a visit to Dogfish Head Brewery's website, when someone at Discovery Channel saw the videos available there. Calagione said, "They could see we take beer very seriously but we don’t take ourselves too seriously."  Discovery Channel decided the show's premise would be to focus on the process of beer creation and production at a specific brewery (in this case, Calagione's own Dogfish Head Brewery).

In March 2011, Anthony Bourdain, who shares a production company with Brew Masters, reported via Twitter that Brew Masters would be cancelled due to pressure by a large beer company who threatened to pull advertising. Author Andy Crouch later confirmed the cancellation, saying it was due to low ratings, rather than pressure from advertisers.

Episodes
Each episode revolves around the creation and production of a specific beer. This is done by outlining the inspiration for creating the brew, then taking the viewer through the process of developing the recipe, testing it, and preparing it for production. Interspersed throughout are anecdotes about beer making, both in general and specific to Dogfish Head Brewery.

A total of six episodes were ordered for the first season.  The first two episodes aired on Sunday nights at 10:00 PM EST/PST. After premiering Episode 3 on a Monday night (November 29) at 10:00 PM EST/PST, episodes 4 & 5 aired on Thursday nights at 8:00 PM EST/PST. The sixth episode was delayed due to its subject matter: the episode was originally to have featured the opening of Dogfish Head's new brewpub at Eataly in New York City.  Delays in the brewpub's opening resulted in the episode remaining incomplete. While the brewpub has since opened, the accompanying episode has never aired in the U.S., though it aired in several other countries, including on DMAX in Germany, where it was titled "3 Biere für Batali".

The Season 1 DVD of the series was released in June 2011, and includes the previously unaired "3 Beers For Batali" episode. Amazon Video offers the first season for download, but this version does not include the unaired sixth episode.

References

External links

Discovery Channel original programming
2010 American television series debuts
2010 American television series endings
Works about beer